M source, which is sometimes referred to as M document, or simply M, comes from  the M in "Matthean material". It is a hypothetical textual source for the Gospel of Matthew. M Source is defined as that 'special material' of the Gospel of Matthew that is neither Q source nor Mark.

History 

Nineteenth century New Testament scholars who rejected the traditional perspective of the priority of Matthew in favor of Marcan priority speculated that the authors of Matthew and Luke drew the material they have in common with the Gospel of Mark from that Gospel. Matthew and Luke, however, also share large sections of text which are not found in Mark. They suggested that neither Gospel drew upon the other, but upon a second common source, termed the Q.

This two-source hypothesis speculates that Matthew borrowed from both Mark and a hypothetical sayings collection, called Q. For most scholars, the Q collection accounts for what Matthew and Luke share – sometimes in exactly the same words – but are not found in Mark. Examples of such material are the Devil's three temptations of Jesus, the Beatitudes, the Lord's Prayer and many individual sayings.

In The Four Gospels: A Study of Origins (1924), Burnett Hillman Streeter argued that a third source, referred to as M and also hypothetical, lies behind the material in Matthew that has no parallel in Mark or Luke. This four-source hypothesis posits that there were at least four sources to the Gospel of Matthew and the Gospel of Luke: the Gospel of Mark, and three lost sources: Q, M, and L. (M material is represented by violet in the above chart.)

Throughout the remainder of the 20th century, there were various challenges and refinements of Streeter's hypothesis. For example, in his 1953 book The Gospel Before Mark, Pierson Parker posited an early version of Matthew (Aram. M or proto-Matthew) as the primary source.

Parker argued that it was not possible to separate Streeter's "M" material from the material in Matthew parallel to Mark.

Composition

Synoptic Gospels and the Nature of M 

The relationship among the three synoptic gospels goes beyond mere similarity in viewpoint. The gospels often recount the same stories, usually in the same order, sometimes using the same words. Scholars note that the similarities between Mark, Matthew, and Luke are too great to be accounted for by mere coincidence. If the four-source hypothesis is correct, then M would probably have been a written document and contained the following:

Primary Gospels 
The primary gospels are those original gospels upon which all others are based. Those who support the four-document hypothesis believe these to be the Gospel of Mark, Q and M.

The Gospel of Mark (40–70) 
Eusebius, in his catalog of ancient church writings, puts the Gospel of Mark in his Homologoumena or "accepted" category. Both modern and ancient Biblical scholars agree that it was the earliest Canonical account of the life of Jesus Christ. It is a primitive, primary source, incorporated into both the Canonical Matthean Gospel as well as Luke-Acts.

A majority of scholars agree that the Gospel of Mark was not written by any of the Apostles, but by an otherwise unimportant figure in the early church. Notwithstanding its shortcomings, it was probably included in the Canon because the Early Church Fathers believed it was a reliable account of the life of Jesus of Nazareth.

In his Church History, Eusebius records that the writer of this gospel was a man named Mark who was Peter's interpreter. It was believed that his accounts of Jesus were historically accurate, but that there was some chronological distortion. It is further agreed that this gospel was originally composed in Koine Greek, near Rome.

Q source (40–70) 
Q source is a hypothetical textual source for the Gospel of Matthew and Gospel of Luke. It is defined as the common material found in Matthew and Luke but not in Mark.  This ancient text supposedly contained the logia or quotations from Jesus.
Scholars believe that an unknown redactor composed Greek-language proto-Gospel. The name Q, coined by the German theologian and biblical scholar Johannes Weiss, stands for "Quelle" (German for "source").

M source (30–50) 
The third primary source is M. Although most scholars accept the four-document hypothesis, many are not entirely happy with it. The difficulty tends to center around M. The Four Document Hypothesis explains the triple tradition by postulating the existence of a lost "Matthean" document known as M. It is this, rather than Marcan priority, which forms the distinctive feature of the Four Document Hypothesis as against rival theories.

While the four-document hypothesis remains a popular explanation for the origins of the synoptic gospels, some question how a major and respected source, used in a canonical gospel, could totally disappear. These individuals question why M was never mentioned in any of the Church catalogs. Also not one scholar from the time of Christ to Jerome has ever mentioned it.  Due to these questions, M will remain in doubt by some, although it continues to be a widely accepted theory among biblical scholars.

See also 

 Jewish-Christian Gospels
 Four-document hypothesis
 Common Sayings Source
 List of Gospels

References

External links 
Online translations of the Gospel of Matthew:
A Four Document Hypothesis
Net Bible
Early Christian Writings
The Development of the Canon of the New Testament

Synoptic problem
Christian terminology
Hypothetical documents